Events from the year 1879 in China.

Incumbents
 Guangxu Emperor (5th year)
 Regent: Empress Dowager Cixi

Events 
Northern Chinese Famine of 1876–79 
 St. John's College (Shanghai) founded

References 

 Jian-Xin Qi, Ming-Sheng Zhu & Wilson R. Lourenço. http://sea-entomologia.org/Publicaciones/RevistaIbericaAracnologia/RIA10/R10-012-137.pdf